Keith Harwood (1950 – September 3, 1977) was a recording engineer, most notable for his work at Olympic Studios with such musicians as David Bowie (on Diamond Dogs in 1974), the Pretty Things and Ron Wood. Harwood collaborated on engineering the Rolling Stones albums It's Only Rock 'n' Roll (1974) and Black and Blue (1976) with brothers Andy and Glyn Johns, respectively. He also engineered a number of Led Zeppelin albums, including Houses of the Holy (1973), Physical Graffiti (1975) and Presence (1976).

In 1977, Harwood had been engineering the New York mixing sessions for the Rolling Stones' Love You Live at Olympic Studios in London, England. On his way home from the sessions, he fell asleep at the wheel as a result of exhaustion.. His car went off the South London road in Queens Ride, Barnes, and into an old sycamore tree, killing him instantly. The Rolling Stones dedicated Love You Live to the memory of Harwood. Marc Bolan died in a car accident at the same location two weeks later.

References

British audio engineers
1950 births
1977 deaths
Road incident deaths in London